Sperry Township is a township in Clayton County, Iowa, USA.  As of the 2000 census, its population was 534.

Geography
According to the USGS, it contains seven cemeteries: Reeds, Ross, Rothfusz, Sacred Heart - Schoolhouse Yard, Sacred Heart, Saint Sebald Lutheran and Stone School.

The streams of Coon Creek, Ensign Creek, Hewett Creek, Kleinlein Creek, Pine Creek and Wolf Creek run through this township.

References
 USGS Geographic Names Information System (GNIS)

External links
 US-Counties.com
 City-Data.com

Townships in Clayton County, Iowa
Townships in Iowa